Dropsuite Limited (formerly branded as Dropmysite) is a software platform founded in 2011 that provides cloud backup, archiving and recovery services based in Singapore. They are a public company listed on the Australian Securities Exchange (ASX:DSE).

Originally, Dropsuite only provided website backup services, but expanded services to include Cloud Backup for Office 365, Cloud Backup for G Suite Gmail, and email archiving. Additional solutions include GDPR Responder, eDiscovery, Insights BI and Ransomware Protection.

Corporation

Company History 
Dropsuite began development under the name Dropmysite in September 2011 when John Fearon’s business website needed a backup solution and he couldn’t find a service that met his needs. Fearon raised $300,000 in a first round of funding on a Singaporean television show called Angel’s Gate. In 2012, he created an email backup service called Dropmyemail.  On October 31, 2013, Charif Elansari took over as CEO. In 2014, a smartphone backup service called Dropmymobile was launched.

Dropmysite has local offices in the US, Singapore, Japan and India. It has entered into partnership with Xpress Hosting, a web-hosting company in Mexico for getting access to 100,000 customers and 500,000 domains.
Dropmysite has also announced partnerships with GMO Cloud and paperboy in Japan. On October 3, 2015, GoDaddy launched a cloud backup service for websites powered by Dropmysite.

In 2016, the company rebranded under the name Dropsuite. On Dec 29, 2016, the company went public on the Australia Securities Exchange via a backdoor listing. In 2017, Dropsuite entered into a distribution agreement with Ingram Micro. On October 22, 2018, Dropsuite entered into a cloud distribution partnership with Pax8.  In 2019, DSD Europe announced a partnership with Dropsuite and is adding Dropsuite’s Microsoft Office 365 Cloud backup and email backup to their cloud backup services.

Management team 
The management team consists of people of different continents including Asia, Africa, and North America and Australia.
 Chairman—Theo Hnarakis
Non-Executive Director—Bruce Tonkin
 CTO—Ron Hart
 CEO—⁣Charif El-Ansari
 COO—⁣Ridley Ruth

Investors 
Dropsuite Limited (ASX:DSE) is a publicly listed company on the Australian Securities Exchange. Originally, Dropmysite is a privately held technology startup that received seed funding for from Crystal Horse Investments, Stanley Street Labs and a few angel investors.

Technology 
The backend of Dropmysite was originally based on Amazon AWS Infrastructure.  Dropsuite provides data backup support to many country-locations in The Americas, Europe, Asia,  and Africa. It utilizes Amazon Web Services data center support to ensure that data remains within country borders, if needed. All user data is stored online and there are no user agents to download and install.

Dropsuite's cloud services protect users' information with military-grade 256-bit advanced encryption, allow legal grade email archiving and are compatible with Microsoft Office 365 and, G Suite Gmail, Hosted Exchange, Open-Xchange and most IMAP/POP email servers.

References 

Backup software
Internet in Singapore